Rebecka Le Moine (born 1 August 1990) is a Swedish politician.  she serves as Member of the Riksdag representing the constituency of Östergötland County. She is affiliated with the Green Party.

She was also elected as Member of the Riksdag in September 2022.

She has a bachelor’s degree in biology of Linköping University. She also has a master's degree in biology, ecology and nature conservation of the same university.

References 

Living people
1990 births
Place of birth missing (living people)
21st-century Swedish politicians
21st-century Swedish women politicians
Members of the Riksdag 2018–2022
Members of the Riksdag 2022–2026
Members of the Riksdag from the Green Party
Women members of the Riksdag
Linköping University alumni
Swedish people of Walloon descent